Charles William Taylor was Dean of Peterborough from 2007 to 2016.

Taylor was born into an ecclesiastical family on 16 March 1953 and educated at St Paul's Cathedral Choir School; Marlborough College; Selwyn College, Cambridge; and Ripon College Cuddesdon. He was ordained in 1977 and his first post was as a Curate at the Collegiate Church of St Peter, Wolverhampton. After this he was a Chaplain at Westminster Abbey from 1979 to 1984 and then the Vicar of Stanmore with Oliver's Battery in the Diocese of Winchester until 1990. He was Rector of North Stoneham and Bassett in the same diocese until 1995 when he became a Tutor in Liturgy at Salisbury and Wells Theological College. He was a Canon Residentiary and Precentor at Lichfield Cathedral for 12 years before his decanal appointment.

References

1953 births
People educated at St. Paul's Cathedral School
People educated at Marlborough College
Alumni of Selwyn College, Cambridge
Alumni of Ripon College Cuddesdon
Deans of Peterborough
Living people